Hemiasterellidae is a family of sponges belonging to the order Tethyida.

Genera:
 Adreus Gray, 1867
 Axos Gray, 1867
 Galaxia Turner, 2020
 Hemiasterella Carter, 1879
 Leptosastra Topsent, 1904
 Liosina Thiele, 1899
 Paratimea
 Stelligera

References

Sponge families